The Savannah, Augusta and Northern Railway began operations around 1908, running from Statesboro, Georgia to Garfield, Georgia.  It was in the process of building from Garfield to Stevens Crossing, Georgia when in went into receivership and was sold to new owners around 1910.  Apparently, the line retained the name under the new ownership however the line was being operated by the Savannah and Statesboro Railway from 1911 to 1915.

On September 1, 1915, the railroad was merged into the Midland Railway.

Defunct Georgia (U.S. state) railroads
Railway companies established in 1907
Railway companies disestablished in 1915
Predecessors of the Southern Railway (U.S.)